Psyllotoxus griseocinctus is a species of beetle in the family Cerambycidae. It was described by James Thomson in 1868. It is known from French Guinea and Brazil.

References

Onciderini
Beetles described in 1868